7 Angels 7 Plagues (abbreviated as 7A7P) was an American metalcore band from Racine, Wisconsin.

History
7 Angels 7 Plagues was formed in 1999 by Jared Logan from the scraps of two local Milwaukee bands, Castahead and Intercede. The band's initial members were Logan on drums, David Lesinski on bass, Matt Matera and Ryan Morgan on guitar, and Temo Rios on vocals; Rios left the group in 2000 and was replaced by Matt Mixon shortly after. A self-released demo EP, Until the Day Breathes and the Shadows Flee, was issued by the band in 2000 while they toured in the midwestern United States. In 2001, 7 Angels 7 Plagues released Jhazmyne's Lullaby.  Allmusic described the album as a "volatile cauldron of sound"; while Canadian music magazine Exclaim! described them as "super-aggressive, hyper-melodic" and noted elements of jazz in the group's sound and graphic design.<ref>[http://exclaim.ca/Reviews/Metal/7_angels_7_plagues-jhazmynes_lullaby Review of Jhazmynes Lullaby]. Exclaim!, March 2002.</ref>

Mixon left the group after the release of the album, and Rios returned to take his place. The group toured in support of Jhazmynes Lullaby, but while en route to a show in Savannah, Georgia in 2002, their tourmates Compromise were involved in a car accident. Soon after this, in July 2002, Rios left 7 Angels 7 Plagues, and Jesse Zaraska, Compromise's vocalist, took his place. Simon Brody, former lead vocalist of Drowningman, considered joining the group but ultimately did not do so. Logan then departed the band several months later, and the group dissolved shortly thereafter.

The band and Uprising decided to re-release the band's first record that originally got them signed to Uprising. Now re-mastered by Alan Douches at West West Side and with new artwork in Bluenote style to match their full-length record, Jhazmyne's Lullaby. A two album set was produced for collectors.

They reunited in December 2005 to play three charity shows with Branden Morgan of Misery Signals filling in on drums. Matthew Matera has started a Mastering and Recording Company called American Modern Studios, located in both Chicago and New York City areas. A retrospective in 2014 stated that the band "continue to be a major influence on young metal and hardcore acts" in the Milwaukee scene, more than a decade after their breakup.

Members
 Ryan Morgan – guitar (1999–2002, 2005) (Misery Signals, Burning Empires)
 Kyle Johnson – bass guitar (2001–2002, 2005) (Misery Signals, Burning Empires, Project Rocket)
 Jesse Zaraska – lead vocals (2002) (Misery Signals, Compromise)
 Jared Logan – drums\songwriter (1999–2002) (Martyr A.D., Up in Arms)
 Matthew Matera – guitar/songwriter(1999–2002) (Dream Party, Royalty in Exile, Dead To Fall, Adriell, Black Candy)
 Cuahtemoc Rios – lead vocals (1999–2000, 2002)
 David Lesinski – bass guitar (1999–2001)
 Matthew Mixon – lead vocals (2000–2002, 2002) (End This Day, Burning Empires, Divine Right, For Death and Glory)

Discography
Studio albums
 Jhazmyne's Lullaby (Uprising Records, 2001)

EPs
 Until the Day Breathes and the Shadows Flee'' (Self Released, 2000, reissued 2002)

References

Heavy metal musical groups from Wisconsin
Metalcore musical groups from Wisconsin
Musical groups established in 1999
Musical groups disestablished in 2002
1999 establishments in Wisconsin